Pinara is the name of:

 Pinara, a large city of Lycia
 Pinara (Pieria), a city of Pieria (Syria), between Cilicia and ancient Syria

Pinara may also refer to:
 Pinara (moth), genus of the family Lasiocampidae